Operation Kheibar was an Iranian offensive in the Iran–Iraq War. It was part of the Battle of the Marshes.

Prelude
After the unsuccessful major offensive named Operation Dawn V aimed directly at Basra, Iran opened a front at the lakes of the Hawizeh Marshes, in an attempt to open another venue from which Basra could be attacked. Due to sanctions Iran lacked spare parts for its American and British made equipment. This became a serious problem for Iran and led to heavy casualties.

Iran enjoyed a zealous force of Pasdaran and Basij, which could not be backed up with sufficient amount of artillery, air support and tanks.

The battle

On February 14, 1984, Iran fought through Iraqi defenses to the oil-rich Majnoon Island. A loss would allow Iraq to regain all territory lost in the battle. Operation Kheibar was Iran's first strategic offensive. The IRIAF could only provide an inadequate 100 combat sorties per day on average. Because of Iran's lack of aircraft, they used helicopters to support their troops. Eventually the Iranians swept across the marshes and forced the Iraqis out of the Majnoon islands—a major disaster for Iraq. Iran now was ready to launch the final attack of the Battle of the Marshes. Iran followed up with a new offensive where 250,000 Iranian troops emerged from the marshland thrusting West and South in the direction of Al-Qurna and Basra respectively, but with the lack of air support as well as lack of armor and artillery, were very vulnerable to Iraqi armored and mechanized forces which managed to repel this large attack. The Iraqis succeeded in containing the Iranians to the Hawizah marsh.

Aftermath

In the end Iran suffered 50,000 casualties in the battle of the Marshes and inflicted 12,000 casualties on Iraq. But for Iraq even 12,000 was an unacceptable toll, as Iraq had a smaller population to draw from. After the battle, Iran tried unsuccessfully to take the Baghdad–Basra highway with Operation Badr. At the end of the War, Iraq expelled the Iranians from Majnoon island by using combined-arms tactics coupled with chemical weapon attacks. Some of the Iranian commanders like Hamid Bakeri were killed in this battle.

See also 
The Mother of all Build-Ups, Air Combat Information Group

Bibliography
 Tabatabai, A. M. (2020). No Conquest, No Defeat: Iran's National Security Strategy. United States: Oxford University Press, Incorporated.
Hooton, E. R., Cooper, T., Nadimi, F. (2019). The Iran-Iraq War. Volume 2 (Revised and Expanded Edition): Iran Strikes Back, June 1982-December 1986. United Kingdom: Helion.
Hiro, D. (1991). The Longest War: The Iran-Iraq Military Conflict. United Kingdom: Routledge.
Pelletiere, S. C. (1992). The Iran-Iraq War: chaos in a vacuum. United Kingdom: Praeger.

References

Military operations of the Iran–Iraq War in 1984
Military operations involving chemical weapons during the Iran–Iraq War